Carl Herbert Lindström (16 March 1886 – 26 October 1951) was a Swedish fisherman who won a gold medal in the tug of war competition at the 1912 Summer Olympics.

References

1886 births
1951 deaths
Tug of war competitors at the 1912 Summer Olympics
Olympic tug of war competitors of Sweden
Olympic gold medalists for Sweden
Olympic medalists in tug of war
Medalists at the 1912 Summer Olympics